Sunita Chand Rajwar  is an Indian film, television and stage actress who graduated from the National School of Drama (NSD), New Delhi in 1997. She acted in Sanjay Khanduri's directorial debut Ek Chalis Ki Last Local as the gangster Chakli, where she was nominated for a Max Stardust Award 2008 in the category Breakthrough Performance – Female.

Early life 
Rajwar was born in Bareilly, Uttar Pradesh and raised in her home town Haldwani, Uttarakhand. She is second of three children, went to Nirmala Convent School, and later pursued her post-graduation from Kumaun University in Nanital. She graduated from the National School of Drama (NSD) in New Delhi in 1997.

Career
After leaving the National School of Drama she moved to Mumbai appearing in several Bollywood movies such as Main Madhuri Dixit Banna Chahti Hoon (2003), Buddha Mar Gaya (2007), The White Elephant (2009), Dark comedy Bollywood Hindi movie Sanket City directed by Pankaj Advani (2009) and Ek Chalis Ki Last Local (2008), It was her role as Chakli, a Mumbai gangster, in Ek Chalis Ki Last Local that gained her a nomination for the Max Stardust Award 2008 in the category Breakthrough Performance – Female. Hisss (2010), Played pivotal role of Mad Granny 'Pagli Dadi' KAFAL: Wild Berries 2013.

She acted in the two-minute thriller, PAAP KA ANTH, which won gold in the Media category at the Abby Awards 2005. She is recently seen in her latest TV commercial ASKME APP With Ranbir Kapoor. She has done many other commercials in the past like "Mahindra Tractors" with Amitabh Bachchan, "Zee Movie Magic Masti," "Maxima Watch," and "Airtel."

She was in Ramayan as Manthara, Hitler Didi (2015) as Jamuna Dhai and Daksha Chachi in Santoshi Ma (2017). Rajwar became a household name with the TV serial Yeh Rishta Kya Kehlata Hai. Apart from Jub Love Hua, Yeh Rishta Kya Kehlata Hai, Ramayan and Hitler Didi, she has had roles in several television series, Rishtay on Zee TV, the horror drama Aahat on Sony TV, the horror show Ssshhhh...Koi Hai on Star Plus, the action crime drama CID on Sony TV and Savdhaan India on Life OK Channel.

Rajwar has played lead roles in plays like The Last Lear, Lady From The Sea, Do Kashtiyon Ka Sawaar, The Farm, Dhruv Swamini, Janm Jay Ka Nag Yagya, Ras Priya, Do Aurtein, Paap Aur Prakash, Ashaad Ka Ek Din, Mummy, including Neena Gupta's Surya Ki Antim Kiran Se Surya Ki Pehli Kiran Tak.

Filmography

Theatrical releases

Writer / assistant director

TV commercials

Television

References

External links 
 

Actresses from Uttarakhand
Indian film actresses
People from Bareilly
1969 births
Living people
People from Haldwani
Indian television actresses